Carpenter's axes or Carpenter's hatchets are small axes, usually slightly larger than a hatchet, used in traditional woodwork, joinery and log-building. They have pronounced beards and finger notches to allow a "choked" grip for precise control.

Carpentry axes have straight, long cutting edges and thin blades with a low bevel angle, making them ideal for working with dry wood. These axes also have straight handles, as the curved handles typical of felling and chopping axes would get in the way of the smaller more precise cuts that tend to be made with carpentry axes. These features allow carpenters axes to be capable of detailed work such as cutting a plank's end to a desired angled with a planed surface and even rudimentary woodcarving.

The long straight edge of carpentry axes provides a good degree of stability when cutting as well as being the ideal shape for guiding the blade by eye.

The poll is generally designed for use as a hammer and newer carpenter's hatchets will often have a groove for pulling nails.

Use in Japanese Carpentry 
In traditional Japanese architecture, wood is the primary building material, as opposed to the western tradition of using stone and brick. Therefore, in the construction of buildings such as temples, carpentry axes are vital for quickly removing large amounts of wood in the initial stages of building, such as the construction of columns and support structures. Japanese carpentry axes have wooden handles that are fitted to a socket and have laminated steel blades, were two different steels are laminated, a harder one for the cutting edge and more soft and flexible steel for the back portion of the head.

Sources

External links 

Axes

bar:Beil
da:Økse
hu:Balta